Le olimpiadi dei mariti (Husbands' Olympics) is a 1960 Italian comedy film directed by Giorgio Bianchi.

Cast 

Ugo Tognazzi: Ugo
Raimondo Vianello: Raimondo
Delia Scala: Delia
Sandra Mondaini: Sandra
Gino Cervi: Director of the newspaper 
Hélène Chanel: Helke
Anna Rasmussen: Greta
Andrea Rapisarda: Colonel von Gruber
Francis Blanche
John Anderson 
Ernesto Calindri 
Lola Braccini
Toni Ucci: Waiter

References

External links

1960 films
1960 comedy films
Italian comedy films
Films directed by Giorgio Bianchi
Films set in Rome
Films set in 1960
Films about the 1960 Summer Olympics
Films scored by Carlo Rustichelli
1960s Italian-language films
1960s Italian films